Miren Edurne Gorrotxategi Azurmendi (born 18 September 1967) is a Spanish Podemos politician. She served in the Senate (2016–2019) and the Congress of Deputies (2019) before leading her party in the 2020 Basque regional election.

Biography
Born in Abadiño, Biscay, Gorrotxategi graduated with a law degree from the University of the Basque Country in 1991 and received a doctorate from the same institution in 1996. She began teaching classes there in constitutional law and the history of political thought in 1992.

Gorrotxategi was elected to the Senate in the 2015 Spanish general election, receiving 8.11% of the vote and taking the last of four seats for the Biscay constituency. In the April 2019 Spanish general election, she was elected to the Congress of Deputies by the same constituency, where she was running as number two on Podemos's list behind Roberto Uriarte. She was one of seven Podemos deputies to lose their seats in the November 2019 election.

In February 2020, Gorrotxategi was elected as Podemos's candidate for Lehendakari (regional president) in the 2020 Basque regional election, defeating the official candidate Rosa Martínez. Her selection caused the party's entire board in the region to resign, and for Greens Equo to leave the Elkarrekin Podemos coalition and run alone. In the election in July, her party fell from eleven seats to six; she was also the least recognisable of the candidates with 43% of respondents in a pre-election poll not knowing who she was.

As of 2020, Gorrotxategi lived in Durango and was married and had two children.

References

1967 births
Living people
People from Abadiño
University of the Basque Country alumni
Academic staff of the University of the Basque Country
Podemos (Spanish political party) politicians
Members of the 11th Senate of Spain
Members of the 12th Senate of Spain
Members of the 13th Congress of Deputies (Spain)
Members of the 12th Basque Parliament
Women members of the Basque Parliament
Women members of the Congress of Deputies (Spain)